Ras Matbakh is a settlement in Qatar located in the municipality of Al Khor. It consists of a cape extending into the Persian Gulf. Large concentrations of mangroves (Avicennia marina) are located off its coast.

It is located to the northeast of Al Khor City and to the southeast of Al Thakhira.

Etymology
"Ras" in Arabic means "head", in this context it is being used to refer to a headland. On the other hand, "matbakh" is translated as "kitchen". This name was given because the area was used a massive fireplace in the past for cooking.

History

In the 1820s, George Barnes Brucks carried out the first British survey of the Persian Gulf. He recorded the following notes about Ras Matbakh:
"Ras Mut Buck is an elevated cape, in lat. 25° 40' N., long. 51° 36' 15' E. This cape should not be approached under four or five fathoms."

A survey conducted by the British Hydrographic Office in 1890 describes the area in significantly more detail:

Infrastructure
Construction of a Qatari Coast Guard station was initiated in 2014. As part of the project, two administrative structures, two supporting structures and a road were built, resulting in a developed area of 3,156 m2 occupying a total area of 16,995 m2.

Ashghal (The Public Works Authority) announced the completion of the 101,000 square meter facility of the Aquatic Fisheries and Research Centre in Ras Matbakh in 2017. The total cost of the project was QR 237.7 million.

Archaeology
During the first large-scale archaeological expedition of Qatar in the 20th century, the Danish Mission, active from 1956 to 1964, made discoveries at Ras Matbakh. The area was first introduced to archaeologists Hans Jørgen Madsen and Jens Aarup Jensen in November 1961 by Ahmed bin Jassim Al Thani, then-ruler of Al Khor. Arriving on 22 November, the two Danish archaeologists surveyed and wrote a report of the site on 23 November. They unearthed a green pot near the coastline containing long-decomposed human remains, likely those of an adult, as well as some animal bones. The Danes estimated that the pot could originate from 500 to 300 BC and stated it resembled the burial tradition and pottery design found in ancient Bahrain and Mesopotamia at that time. Thus, they postulated that it may have been a burial for a Bahraini or Mesopotamian sailor who died near the site.

References

External links
Geographic.org

Populated places in Al Khor
Archaeological sites in Qatar